Southland Center (also known as Southland Mall) is an enclosed mall located at 23000 Eureka Road in Taylor, Michigan (a Downriver community located southwest of Detroit), exactly halfway between U.S. Highway 24 (Telegraph Road) and the Interstate 75 freeway. The anchor stores are Cinemark Theatres, Forever 21, Best Buy, Shoe Carnival, JCPenney, and Macy's. Other major stores include H&M and Ulta Beauty. It is the newest of the Detroit area's four "land" malls (Northland, Southland, Eastland, Westland). Southland Center opened on July 20, 1970. It is owned and managed by Brookfield Properties, one of the largest mall owners in the United States.

History 

Southland Center was designed by Victor Gruen Associates and Louis G. Redstone Associates, and the newly formed Dayton-Hudson Corporation (a merger of Dayton's of Minneapolis and Hudson's of Detroit) developed the mall. When opened in 1970, Southland Mall was originally anchored by a three-level;  Hudson's at the center of the mall and junior-anchored by a Woolworth's dime store off the center court and a Kroger supermarket on the eastern side. A two-screen movie theater, located off the west court, opened just weeks after the rest of the mall. Kroger built a larger facility across Eureka Road in the mid-1970s, with the former store gutted and divided into several smaller stores, attached to a new wing ending in a new two-level;  JCPenney store in 1976. In 1986, the theater, by then a four-screen venue, was purchased by AMC Theatres. In 1988, a small addition was built onto the western side, including a  Mervyns store that opened on August 12 of that year, and in October, The Rouse Company acquired the mall from its previous owners.

First announced in 1991, a food court called Picnic In The Garden broke ground on February 13, 1992 and opened on November 19, 1992, featuring a large triangular-shaped skylight, along with an expansion to Champs Sports' store and a new Lerner New York store. AMC's four-screen theater closed in January 1999 and was replaced with a  Borders Books & Music a year later. Hudson's was renamed Marshall Field's in 2001 and Macy's in 2006. Also in 2006, Mervyns exited Michigan and vacated its anchor in the mall (that space was subsequently demolished in 2015) and the food court, which had lost all of its tenants in late 2005, was demolished (except for the skylight) and rebuilt into a  Best Buy store. Later, in 2011, the Borders store shut down when that chain became defunct. Rouse Properties was spun off from General Growth Properties in January 2012. The company then added several new tenants; including rue21, Torrid and Taco Bell, to Southland Center, in addition, several existing tenants also renovated their stores. Forever 21 moved from an existing store in the mall to the former Borders space in spring 2013. Then, later in 2013, several smaller store spaces near JCPenney were demolished and replaced by a new  Shoe Carnival store (which relocated from a strip development across Eureka Road).

On July 2, 2014, Rouse Properties announced that the vacant-for-eight-years Mervyn's space would be replaced by a 12-screen, all-digital, Cinemark multiplex theater (which ultimately opened in April 2016 after several opening date changes), accompanied by several outdoor sit-down restaurants, including the first Grimaldi's Pizzeria in Michigan (which opened in 2017 and barely lasted over a year before closing on July 19, 2018). This announcement came just one day after an announcement by MJR Theatres that they would be reopening the former AMC Star Taylor 10 multiplex theater across Eureka Road by the 2014 Christmas season, however, that plan never materialized and that building remains abandoned. In addition, in the late summer of 2014, a complete renovation of the mall began. This project added new flooring and lighting, removed the fountain and replaced it with seating and electronic-device chargers and added several more tenants including Pink, Francesca's and Zumiez. This project was completed in the summer of 2015. Ulta opened a location in the mall along the corridor between Macy's and Best Buy on August 29, 2014. H&M opened on October 1, 2015, requiring the demolition of a total of ten smaller storefronts stretching from the west court into the Cinemark wing, necessitating the relocation of the Taco Bell restaurant across the corridor.

As of September 2018, a portion of the third floor of the Macy's store is now a Macy's Backstage outlet store. In 2022, Brookfield defaulted on the mall's $78.5 million loan that was due for payment in July of that year, becoming the third Metro Detroit mall to face financial issues and/or defaults in the wake of the COVID-19 pandemic, following Fairlane Town Center and The Mall at Partridge Creek.

References

External links
 Southland Center homepage

Brookfield Properties
Shopping malls in Wayne County, Michigan
Shopping malls established in 1970
1970 establishments in Michigan
Victor Gruen buildings
Taylor, Michigan